Kaash Aisa Ho was a 2013 television series that aired on ARY Digital. Series was written by Maha Malik, directed by Sohail Javed and Produced by Asif Raza Mir and Babar Javed of A&B Entertainment. It stars Saba Qamar and Mohib Mirza in lead. It was also aired in India on Zindagi TV under the same title from 27 July 2016 and ended its run on 20 August 2016.

Plot
Kaash Aisa Ho is a tale of Irfa (Saba Qamar) an orphan. She is in love with Shayan (Mohib Mirza) her cousin, since her childhood. Shayan on the other hand being fond of her doesn't noticed her love towards him and mistaken her for mere affection. Shayan is obsessed with perfection and wants a divine goddess for him. Although after many consequences they happily married to each other. They have a child after their marriage but eventually after some disputes he leaves Irfa and her child behind and from where Irfa journey's begin of a single parent. Story explores the journey of Irfa who was orphan and now once again became a helpless with her child.

Cast
Saba Qamar as Irfa
Mohib Mirza as Shayan
Juggan Kazim
Zainab Qayyum
Shahood Alvi
Tahira Imam
Sana Askari
Jahanzeb Gurchani
Yasra Rizvi

References

External links
 Kaash Aisa Ho on official website

2013 Pakistani television series debuts